The women's 500 m time trial at the UEC European Track Championships was first competed in 2014 in Guadeloupe, France.

Medalists

References

 
Women's 500 m time trial
Women's time trial (track cycling)